Yumnam Khemchand Singh is a Bharatiya Janata Party politician from Manipur. He has been elected in Manipur Legislative Assembly election in 2017 and 2022 from Singjamei constituency as candidate of Bharatiya Janata Party. He was the Speaker of Manipur Legislative Assembly (2017-2022). Currently he is a Cabinet Minister for Municipal Administration Housing Development (MAHUD) and Education Department in Second Biren Singh ministry.

References 

Living people
Bharatiya Janata Party politicians from Manipur
Manipur MLAs 2017–2022
Year of birth missing (living people)
People from Imphal
Speakers of the Manipur Legislative Assembly
Manipur MLAs 2022–2027